The 2016 Nadeshiko League for Japan's women's association football Nadeshiko League was won by NTV Beleza, who have won the title 14 times.

Nadeshiko League Division 1

Result

League awards

Best player

Top scorers

Best eleven

Best young player

Fighting-spirit award

Nadeshiko League Division 2

Result

 Best Player: Saki Oyama, Nojima Stella Kanagawa Sagamihara
 Top scorers: Alisa Minamino, Nojima Stella Kanagawa Sagamihara
 Top scorers: Michelle Pao, Nojima Stella Kanagawa Sagamihara
 Top scorers: Syoko Uemura, Nippon Sport Science University Fields Yokohama
 Best young player: Hikari Takagi, Nojima Stella Kanagawa Sagamihara

Challenge League (Division 3)

Regular season

East

West

Season playoffs

Championship playoff

5–8 position playoff

9–12 position playoff

 Best Player: Yoshie Matsunaga, Orca Kamogawa F.C.
 Top scorers: Asami Hirano, Shizuoka Sangyo University Iwata Bonita
 Best young player: Shizuka Mitsuhori, Yamato Sylphid

Promotion/relegation series

Division 1 promotion/relegation series

 Chifure AS Elfen Saitama Promoted to Division 1 in 2017 season.
 Konomiya Speranza Osaka-Takatsuki relegated to Division 2 in 2017 season.

Division 2 promotion/relegation series

 F.C. Kibi International University Charme stay Division 2 in 2017 season.
 Yamato Sylphid stay Division 3 (Challenge League) in 2017 season.

Division 3 promotion/relegation series

Qualifying round

Group A

Group B

Position final

Qualifying final

MITO EIKO F.C. Ibaragi Ladies will play match with Tsukuba F.C. Ladies (final round A)
F.C.Jumonji Ventus will play match with Japan Soccer College Ladies (final round B)

Final round A

 Tsukuba F.C. Ladies Stay Division 3 (Challenge League) in 2017 season.
 MITO EIKO F.C. Ibaragi Ladies Stay Regional League (Kanto League) in 2017 season.

Final round B

 F.C.Jumonji Ventus promoted to Division 3 (Challenge League) in 2017 season.
 Japan Soccer College Ladies relegated to Regional League (Hokushinetsu League) in 2017 season.

See also
Empress's Cup
Football in Japan
List of football clubs in Japan

External links
  Nadeshiko League Official Site
season on soccerway.com

Nadeshiko League seasons
1
L
Japan
Japan